The 2016–17 season was Dukla Prague's sixth consecutive season in the Czech First League.

Players

Squad information

Transfers

In 
In the summer of 2016, striker Peter Olayinka arrived on a year-long loan from Belgian side Ghent. Defenders Ondřej Kušnír, Jakub Podaný and Jan Šimůnek joined as free agents. Other players to arrive were Štěpán Koreš, Ondřej Brejcha and Ladislav Vopat. Midfielder Jan Juroška returned to the club after a loan period at Táborsko.

In January 2017 Příbram midfielder Patrik Brandner joined the club, signing a contract until the end of the 2018–19 season. Striker Jan Holenda signed a contract with Dukla until the summer of 2019. Two players arrived from Slovak side Myjava: goalkeeper Matúš Hruška and midfielder Frederik Bilovský. Bosnian midfielder Zinedin Mustedanagić joined on loan from Sparta.

Out 
Long-serving midfielder Tomáš Berger left the club to join local rivals Bohemians 1905. Goalkeeper David Tetour, forward Jakub Mareš, defenders Josip Jurendić and Kaspars Gorkšs, as well as midfielder Marek Hlinka also left the club in the summer.

Three strikers left Dukla in the middle of the season: Spanish striker Néstor Albiach left to join Sparta Prague having scored five league goals in the season so far, French forward Jean-David Beauguel joined league rivals Zlín, while Congolese Budge Manzia joined second-tier side Olomouc. Bosnian midfielder Aldin Čajić departed for Turkish side Elazığspor. Slovak midfielder Jakub Považanec transferred to Jablonec. Slovak goalkeeper Lukáš Hroššo left for Slovak side Nitra, having kept two clean sheets in nine league matches. Ondřej Vrzal joined Bohemians 1905 on loan, while Ladislav Vopat was loaned to České Budějovice.

Management and coaching staff

Source:

Statistics

Appearances and goals

Home attendance
The club had the lowest average attendance in the league.

Czech First League

Results by round

Results summary

League table

Matches

July

August

September

October

November

December

February

March

April

May

Cup 

As a First League team, Dukla entered the Cup at the second round stage. In the second round, Dukla faced Bohemian Football League side Převýšov, winning 3–0 away from home. The third round match against third-tier side FC Velké Meziříčí resulted in a 2–1 win for Dukla as the visiting team.

In the fourth round, Dukla faced fellow First League team MFK Karviná, again away from home. 1–1 at full time, the game entered extra time, where each team scored once more. Karviná prevailed 4–2 in the ensuing penalty shootout to end Dukla's cup run for another season.

References 

Dukla Prague
FK Dukla Prague seasons